The Explosive Generation is a 1961 film directed by Buzz Kulik. It stars William Shatner and Patty McCormack.

Plot

The story is about Peter Gifford, a teacher who wants to teach high school students to think for themselves and express themselves. A female student pushes to have open classroom discussion about the physical and emotional issues associated with teenage relationships and sex.  This issue gets blown out of proportion by parents who don't have the facts and jump to ill-informed conclusions, demanding sanctions against the mostly innocent teacher, who keeps still on the matter to protect the involved students.  The entire student body rallies in a Gandhiesque silent protest that helps everyone learn to appreciate the truth of the matter.

Cast
William Shatner as Peter Gifford
Patty McCormack as Janet Sommers
Lee Kinsolving as Dan Carlyle
Virginia Field as Mrs. Katie Sommers
Billy Gray as Bobby Herman Jr.
Steve Dunne as Bobby Herman Sr.
Phillip Terry as Mr. Carlyle
Arch Johnson as Mr. George Sommers
Edward Platt as Mr. Morton
Beau Bridges as Mark
Stafford Repp as Police Captain
Vito Scotti as Custodian
Jocelyn Brando as Mrs. Ryker (uncredited)
David Geffen as Student (uncredited)

See also
 List of American films of 1961

References

External links

1961 films
1960s teen drama films
American teen drama films
American high school films
American black-and-white films
Films directed by Buzz Kulik
Films about educators
United Artists films
1961 directorial debut films
1961 drama films
1960s English-language films
1960s American films